Acianthera violaceomaculata is a species of orchid plant native to Brazil.

References 

violaceomaculata
Flora of Brazil